Gonzalo Garza Independence High School is an alternative high school in the Austin Independent School District and is located at 1600 Chicon Street in Austin, Texas. It opened in January 1998 under then-principal Victoria Baldwin and is open to any student entering their third year of high school with 10 or more credits. Garza offers a non-traditional, self-paced approach and enrolls about 300 students. In the 2005–2006 school year, Garza had 194 graduates.

During the summer students from AISD can take classes at the school online to gain credits.  

Garza has received numerous awards and recognitions, including the Austin Chronicle award for Best Public School Model.

References

External links
Garza Independence High School at AustinISD.org
Gonzalo Garza Independence High School homepage

High schools in Austin, Texas
Austin Independent School District high schools
Educational institutions established in 1998
1998 establishments in Texas